The Schwaben Cup (German: Schwäbischer Pokal) was a domestic cup competition in the Bavarian Regierungsbezirk of Swabia (German: Schwaben), played from 1947 to 2009.

Overview
The competition was first played in 1947, before the reintroduction of the German Cup. With the introduction of the national cup competition, the Schwaben Cup also became a qualifying competition for it.

The Schwaben Cup has been played annually since 1947 with the exception of 1956 and 1957, when it was not held. The competition was open to all senior men's teams from the Bezirk of Schwaben and clubs that play in the Schwaben football league system. However, it was not open to professional teams, meaning a club in the Bundesliga or 2. Bundesliga could not take part. The FC Augsburg, record winner of the competition, currently in the second division, would therefore not have been able to enter its first team. The competition was also open to reserve sides.

From 1998, the Schwaben Cup winner was eligible to take part in the Bavarian Cup and past winners have also taken part in this competition and thereby qualified for the German Cup. The TSV Aindling in 2003 and the TSG Thannhausen in 2006 have done so.

A fixed rule of the competition was that the lower classed team would always have home advantage. Further in the past, another rule stipulated that the lower classed team did not need to win a tie to advance, a draw being sufficient. This rule was however very unpopular with the stronger clubs and was rescinded after the 1998 final.

With the expansion of the Bavarian Cup from 2009–10 onwards, the Schwaben Cup ceased to be held. The only thing remaining of the old competition is the three Kreis Cup competitions, who now function as a qualifying round to the Bavarian Cup.

Modus
The cup operated on a system where it is split into three regions, Augsburg, Allgäu and Donau. Each of those regions roughly covers the areas of two Kreissligas:

Donau: 
 Kreisliga Schwaben-Nord 
 Kreisliga Schwaben-West
Augsburg: 
 Kreisliga Schwaben-Augsburg 
 Kreisliga Schwaben-Ost
Allgäu: 
 Kreisliga Schwaben-Mitte 
 Kreisliga Schwaben-Süd

Clubs from the Kreisliga, the Kreisklasses and A-Klasses below it but also the clubs in the Bezirksliga and Bezirksoberliga from this area play out a cup winner of their own. This winner then faces the winner of its sister region (German: Kreis). The three remaining clubs of this competitions then entered the final rounds of the Schwaben Cup, together with the clubs from Schwaben which play in the Landesliga, Bayernliga and Regionalliga. 

At the end of this process was the Schwaben Cup final which was played at a neutral ground.

Cup finals since 1947

Source: 

Winner always mentioned first.
In 1965, 1994 and 1998 the title went to the lower-classed team in a drawn final.

Winners and runners-up of the Schwaben Cup
The 43 teams that have won the cup or played in its final during its history:

DFB-Pokal appearances
Since 1974, the Schwaben Cup winners, and in some seasons the runners-up, an eligible to qualify for the first round of the German Cup. In the past, qualification matches against the cup winners from the other six Bavarian regional cup competition were necessary, since the establishment of the Bavarian Cup, this competition functions as qualifying stage. On a large number of occasions, the FC Augsburg has qualified for the German Cup on merit of its membership to the 2. Bundesliga, these appearances are not listed here:

Source:

References

Sources
 Das Fussball Jahresjournal  Annual end-of-season magazine of the Swabian FA

External links 
 Bayrischer Fussball Verband (Bavarian FA)  
 Schwaben branch of the Bavarian FA  
 The Bavarian Cup (BFV website)  

Football cup competitions in Bavaria

Defunct football competitions in Bavaria
1947 establishments in Germany
2009 disestablishments in Germany
Recurring sporting events established in 1947
Recurring events disestablished in 2009
Defunct football cup competitions in Germany